Odites albidella is a moth in the family Depressariidae. It was described by Pieter Cornelius Tobias Snellen in 1901. It is found on Java.

References

Moths described in 1901
Odites